The 2020–21 Bangalore Super Division was the 18th season of the Bangalore Super Division, the fourth tier of the Indian association football system and the top tier of the Karnataka football system. The season started on 12 January 2021. Bengaluru FC 'B' were the defending champions. All games were played at Bangalore Football Stadium. The league was contested by top 12 teams from 2019–20 season as well as Young Challengers and FC Deccan who were promoted from 2019–20 Bangalore 'A' division. AGORC were relegated to 2020–21 Bangalore A Division.

Teams
Thirteen teams competed in the league.

After withdrawal of Ozone FC and South United FC from the league, Students Union who were supposed to be relegated along with last placed AGORC FC were allowed to continue in the top division while Young Challengers and FC Deccan joined after gaining promotion from Bangalore A Division League.

Foreign players

Table

Matches

January

February

March

Season statistics

Top scorers
As of 16 March 2021.

Awards

Bangalore Super Division Outstanding players of the week award

BDFA Super Division League 2020-21 best player awards

References

Bangalore Super Division seasons
2020–21 in Indian football leagues